John Allman Hemingway,  (born 17 July 1919) is an Irish former Royal Air Force fighter pilot. He served during the Second World War in the Battle of Dunkirk, the Battle of Britain, the Allied invasion of Italy and the Invasion of Normandy. Following the death of William Clark in May 2020, Hemingway became the last verified surviving airman of the Battle of Britain. He was shot down four times during the Second World War.

Early life
Hemingway was born on 17 July 1919, in Dublin into a Church of Ireland family. He attended St. Patrick's Cathedral Choir School and St Andrew's College.

RAF career
Hemingway was accepted to serve in the Royal Air Force and was granted a short service commission on 7 March 1938. In January 1939, Hemingway began training in Brough, East Riding of Yorkshire. On 7 March 1939, he was appointed in service as a pilot officer. By early 1940, following the outbreak of the Second World War, he was in service with No. 85 Squadron RAF in France, destroying a He 111 on 10 May. The following day, Hemingway destroyed a Do 17 and was forced to make a landing near Maastricht after his plane was damaged. By 15 May, the British Army had brought him to Lille-Seclin and he returned to England two days later. During the Battle of Dunkirk he flew supporting missions over the English Channel.

Hemingway initially served in England with No. 253 Squadron RAF before returning to No. 85 Squadron on 15 June. Hemingway fought in the Battle of Britain, waged from July to October 1940. His plane was damaged on 18 August while over the Thames Estuary, and he was forced to bail out. He was again shot down over Eastchurch on 26 August; making Hemingway 85 Squadron's first official combat victim over Britain. Five days later he damaged a Bf 109. On 3 September 1940, he was promoted to flying officer, and on 22 September made a forced landing due to poor weather near Church Fenton. On 1 July 1941 Hemingway was awarded the Distinguished Flying Cross.

Exhausted, Hemingway was given generally light duties for several years. On 7 July 1941 he began serving with No. 1452 Flight RAF at West Malling. He served as an air traffic controller during the Invasion of Normandy. On 1 January 1944 he was made a temporary squadron leader. From April to December 1945 he commanded No. 43 Squadron RAF. The squadron served in Italy, and Hemingway was shot down for a fourth time.

With the Second World War over, Hemingway was posted to the Middle East. He was promoted to flight lieutenant on 23 January 1946, and on 6 March 1946 was made a war substantive squadron leader. On 15 July 1948, Hemingway was promoted to squadron leader. On 1 July 1954 he was promoted to wing commander. Hemingway later served as station commander of RAF Leconfield, was staff officer at NATO in France, and finally served in the Air Ministry. Promoted to group captain on 1 January 1969, he retired on 12 September.

Personal life
Hemingway married Bridget and had three children. She died in 1998. He lived in Canada for a few years, but returned to Ireland in 2011. He was one of the nine surviving members of The Few in July 2018. By 2019, he was living in a nursing home near Dublin. When William Clark died on 7 May 2020, Hemingway became the last verified surviving airman of the Battle of Britain.

References

Further reading
 
 

1919 births
Royal Air Force pilots of World War II
Living people
Recipients of the Distinguished Flying Cross (United Kingdom)
Royal Air Force group captains
The Few
British centenarians
Men centenarians
Military personnel from Dublin (city)
Irish emigrants to the United Kingdom